Jeremiah Wilson "Jay" Nixon (born February 13, 1956) is an American lawyer and politician who served as the 55th Governor of Missouri from 2009 to 2017. A member of the Democratic Party, he was first elected to the governorship in 2008 and reelected in 2012. Prior to his tenure as Missouri Governor, he served as the 40th Missouri Attorney General from 1993 to 2009. After leaving public office he joined the Dowd Bennett law firm in St. Louis. As of 2022, he is the most recent Democrat to serve as the Governor of Missouri.

Early life
Nixon was born and raised in De Soto, Missouri. His mother, Betty Lea Nixon (née Wilson), was a teacher and president of the local school board, and his father, Jeremiah "Jerry" Nixon, served as the city's mayor. One of his three paternal great-grandfathers, Abraham Jonas, was an early Jewish settler in Illinois and friend of former President Abraham Lincoln (one of Nixon's paternal great-grandmothers was Jewish, though Nixon is Methodist). His great-great-grandfather Charles Henry Jonas was the brother of Democratic U.S. Senator Benjamin F. Jonas of Louisiana and another, James Oscar Nixon, was a brother of U.S. Representative John Thompson Nixon of New Jersey. Another paternal ancestor, John Inskeep, served as Mayor of Philadelphia (from 1800—1801 and 1805—1806).

Missouri State Senate (1987–1993)
In 1986, after a period of private practice in his hometown, Jay Nixon was elected to the Missouri Senate from a district in Jefferson County, serving for two terms from 1987 to 1993.

Missouri Attorney General (1993–2009)

Accomplishments

As the state's Attorney General, Nixon created the Environmental Protection Division to enforce Missouri's environmental laws. Attorneys in this division take legal action to stop the pollution of the state's air, water and soil and to look after Missouri's agricultural interests. Successful litigation by the division has resulted in the cleanup of polluted sites and millions of dollars awarded to the state. His aggressive actions in the Attorney General's Office earned him national recognition. Barrister magazine named him one of the 20 outstanding young lawyers in the nation, and the Missouri Jaycees selected him one of Ten Outstanding Young Missourians. Prior to becoming Attorney General, he was recognized by the Conservation Federation of Missouri for his environmental work as a state senator.

In 2013, he joined with nine mayors to establish July 15 as Social Media Giving Day, encouraging citizens to support charities via social media.

Controversies
Jay Nixon has overseen the state's involvement in the court settlements that ended mandatory urban busing in St. Louis and Kansas City's public schools.

The Missouri Information Analysis Center (MIAC) issued a report titled "The Modern Militia Movement" on February 20, 2009, informing the Missouri State Highway Patrol of several groups of people who could possibly be linked to domestic militia groups. According to the report, these groups included white Christians, supporters of third-party presidential candidates Ron Paul, Bob Barr, and Chuck Baldwin, as well as opponents of gun control, illegal immigration, abortion, the Federal Reserve System, and the Internal Revenue Service. Following a joint letter from Paul, Barr, and Baldwin condemning the report, Nixon and the MIAC issued an apology concerning the report and stated that it will no longer be displayed on any official state websites.

Governor of Missouri (2009–2017)

Elections

2008 election

Governor Matt Blunt announced on January 22, 2008 that he would not seek a second term. By the filing deadline on March 25, 2008, three Democratic and five Republican candidates had filed. Nixon won the nomination and the election.

2012 election

Nixon defeated Republican Dave Spence to win a second term in 2012, running on a platform of fiscal responsibility and bipartisanship.

Tenure

Appointments
Following the death of Tom Schweich, Gov. Nixon appointed Boone County Treasurer Nicole Galloway to the post of Missouri State Auditor in 2015. Galloway later won a full term as state auditor in the 2018 general election.

Budget
Throughout his time in office, Nixon made budget restrictions to account for lower-than-expected revenues, or statutory changes affecting the budget. Upon taking office, Nixon "began cutting spending almost immediately and has made repeated reductions to the budgets passed by the Legislature in subsequent years."

In 2010, Nixon was called the state's budget "cutter-in-chief" by the Associated Press for his efforts to reduce spending and right-size state government.

Some of Nixon's budget restrictions drew criticism and in 2011 Missouri State Auditor Tom Schweich filed suit arguing that Nixon lacked the constitutional authority to restrict spending.  Schweich's lawsuit was dismissed by the Missouri Supreme Court in 2013 but the following year the Missouri General Assembly passed and voters approved Amendment 10, granting legislators the ability to overrule a governor's budget restrictions.

Economy

After taking office during the Great Recession, Nixon focused on creating jobs, investing in education and strengthening the state's economy while keeping the budget in balance.

From November 2015 to November 2016, Missouri added 57,100 jobs, more than all eight of its neighboring states.

Aiming to revitalize the state's automotive manufacturing industry, Nixon created an Automotive Jobs Task Force and in 2011 called a special session of the General Assembly to pass the Missouri Manufacturing Jobs Act. On October 21, 2011 Ford confirmed that it would make a $1.1 billion investment in its Kansas City Assembly Plant and add 1,600 jobs at the facility. On November 4, 2011 General Motors announced plans for a $380 million investment in its Wentzville plant outside St. Louis.

The St. Louis Post Dispatch editorialized that "key to both Ford and GM agreeing to expand in the state were incentives championed in last year's Legislative special session by Gov. Jay Nixon, a Democrat, and the then-leaders of the House and Senate, Ron Richard and Charlie Shields, both Republicans."

Education

During his eight years in office, Nixon negotiated four tuition freezes for students at public higher education institutions.

Disaster response
Nixon drew praise for his handling of natural disasters, including the state's response to the EF-5 tornado that struck Joplin on May 22, 2011. The Associated Press in 2011 called him "a ubiquitous commander of disasters."

Public Defender System funding crisis
On August 2, 2016, Michael Barrett, director of the Missouri State Public Defender System, called on Nixon to act as a public defender in a criminal assault case.  Nixon's communications director, Scott Holste, questioned the authority of Barrett to do so. The appointment followed a July 2016 legal action in which Barrett et al. challenged the constitutionality of restricting funds for indigent defense.
In an open letter to Nixon, Barrett cited Missouri Revised Statues Section 600.042.5(1) as well as the 6th and 14th amendments to the United States Constitution as reasons for the controversial action. Barrett blamed Nixon for the underfunding and understaffing of the public defender system and chose to appoint him because he was "the one attorney in the state who not only created the problem, but is in a unique position to address it."
According to Barrett, the funding for "resources that assist with delivering legal services" had increased between 5 and 6% since 2009, while costs over the same period had increased 18%.  The case load had increased over 12% in the past year. According to a 2008 report by the National Legal Aid & Defender Association, Missouri ranks 49th in per capita legal aid spending.
Ruth Petsch, Jackson County Missouri's chief public defender, cited the lack of funding for inadequate defense and 9 to 12 month delays in adjudication for indigent persons who often remain in jail and are unable to maintain active employment during that time.

Shooting of Michael Brown and Ferguson unrest

Gov. Nixon first turned over control of the town to the Missouri State Highway Patrol and later declared a state of emergency and implemented nightly curfews, later calling in the National Guard to help restore peace and order. The unrest continued on November 24, 2014 after the police officer who shot Michael Brown was not indicted by a grand jury.

After politics
From April 15–19, 2019 Nixon served as a visiting Menschel Senior Leadership Fellow at the Harvard T.H. Chan School of Public Health.

Nixon represents televangelist Jim Bakker in his lawsuit filed by Missouri Attorney General Eric Schmitt for allegedly selling false cures for the 2019-20 strains of coronavirus.

Personal life

After leaving office Nixon moved to University City, Missouri with his wife Georganne. The couple have two adult sons, Jeremiah and Will, both named after their father. Nixon is a Methodist.

Electoral history

As Governor

As Attorney General

U.S. Senate elections

References

External links

 
 Attorney General website 
 Governor website 

|-

|-

|-

|-

|-

1956 births
21st-century American politicians
Methodists from Missouri
American people of English-Jewish descent
Democratic Party governors of Missouri
Living people
Missouri Attorneys General
Democratic Party Missouri state senators
People from De Soto, Missouri
University of Missouri alumni